Bangen Abdullah Rekani (Kurdish: Bengîn Rêkanî, born 2 April 1966) is an Iraqi politician from the Kurdistan Democratic Party. He was Minister of Construction and Housing and Municipalities and Public works from 2018 to 2020. He had previously served as Minister of Justice in the Government of Adil Abdul-Mahdi.

He was approved by the Council of Representatives on 24 October 2018. Rekani was also the representative of the Kurdistan Democratic Party and the representative of Masoud Barzani, former President of the Kurdistan region. He was head of relations between the Kurdish and Iraqi political parties and the government in Baghdad.

From 2010 to 2014 he was Deputy Minister of Transportation under the second government of Nouri al-Maliki.

References 

Government ministers of Iraq
Living people
Year of birth missing (living people)